Firewalking is a technique developed by Mike Schiffman and David Goldsmith that utilizes traceroute techniques and TTL values to analyze IP packet responses in order to determine gateway ACL (Access Control List) filters and map networks. It is an active reconnaissance network security analysis technique that attempts to determine which layer 4 protocols a specific firewall will allow.

Firewalk is a software tool that performs Firewalking.

To protect a firewall or gateway against firewalking one can block ICMP Time Exceeded messages.

See also 
 Access Control List
 Firewall (computing)
 Traceroute

References

External links 
 Firewalk tool, an Open Source tool that determines gateway ACL filters and maps networks by analyzing IP packets responses.
 WooterWoot, an Open Source set of tools that builds Check Point, Cisco ASA, or Netscreen policies from logfiles.
 Use Firewalk in Linux/UNIX to verify ACLs and check firewall rule sets, article on using Firewalk, by Lori Hyde CCNA.
 firewalk(8) - Linux man page
 GIAC / SANS Institute Description of Firewalking

Computer network security